The 1st Aviation Brigade is a brigade of the Polish Armed Forces, headquartered in Inowrocław. The brigade is designed to provide military aviation support to the Polish Land Forces.

History
The 1st Aviation Brigade was formed in 2011 based on the decision of the Minister of National Defense. Elements of the brigade took part in the War in Afghanistan, providing air support for Polish ground contingents. The brigade's anniversary was set to 6 June while a commemorative badge of the 1st Air Force Brigade was also introduced by the Minister of National Defense in April 2012.

Structure

The brigade is structured as follows:
 1st Army Aviation Brigade in Inowrocław
 49th Air Base in Pruszcz Gdański
 1st Squadron with 12x Mi-24W attack helicopters
 2nd Squadron with 12x Mi-2URP attack helicopters
 3rd Squadron with 16x Mi-2 NVG training helicopters
 56th Air Base in Inowrocław
 1st Squadron with 12x Mi-24W attack helicopters
 2nd Squadron with 12x Mi-2URP attack helicopters
 3rd Squadron with 8x PZL W-3PL Głuszec combat search and rescue helicopters
 Air Reconnaissance Squadron in Mirosławiec with 45x Orbiter unmanned aerial vehicles

Commanders
 Brigadier General Krzysztof Mitręga (June 2011 - February 2014)
 Brigadier General pil. Dariusz Wroński (February 2014 - January 2015)
 Colonel Wiesław Franczak (January 2015 - June 2015)
 Colonel Sławomir Mąkosa (June 2015 - present)

References

Military units and formations established in 2011
Army brigades of Poland
Army aviation brigades